Pete Rose (1942-2018) was an American recorder player, composer, and critic. He was the foremost interpreter of contemporary classical music for recorder, and one of the few recorder players to play jazz on the instrument.

As a performer, his repertoire included the music of Daniel Goode, Ryohei Hirose, Luciano Berio, and Benjamin Thorn.
His many published works are enumerated on his web page.

Rose also penned a number of comprehensive articles documenting the use of the recorder in contemporary classical music, and numerous reviews of recorder music for the American Recorder magazine and others.

Pete Rose resided in Bridgewater, New Jersey where he also gave lessons to new and advancing recordists.

Discography
2004 - Recorderist Pete Rose (Pitch)
Daniel Goode - Eight Thrushes in New York (Frog Peak Music)

References

External links
Pete Rose official site
Pete Rose page

1942 births
Living people
American recorder players
20th-century classical composers
American male classical composers
American classical composers
American jazz musicians
20th-century American composers
Place of birth missing (living people)
20th-century American male musicians
American male jazz musicians
20th-century flautists